Norview High School is a public high school in central Norfolk, Virginia. Norview High School is one of the five local high schools that serve the city. It is home of the Dodson Scholars Program and the Leadership Center for Science and Engineering program (or commonly referred to as LCSE). On February 2, 1959, Norview High School admitted its first African American students to attend the previously all-white school. These students were a part of the Norfolk 17, who were first to integrate schools in Virginia.

References

External links
School website
NHS alumni

Public high schools in Virginia
Schools in Norfolk, Virginia
Educational institutions established in 1922
1922 establishments in Virginia